John Henry Raney (September 28, 1849 – January 23, 1928) was a U.S. Representative from Missouri.

Born in Gravelton, Missouri, Raney attended Union School, Des Arc, Missouri, and Woods School, Virginia Settlement, Missouri.
He served as judge of the county court of Wayne County in 1880–1882.
He studied law.
He was admitted to the bar in 1881 and commenced practice at Greenville, Missouri.
He also engaged in agricultural pursuits and as a stock raiser.
He served as prosecuting attorney of Wayne County in 1882–1888.
He was an unsuccessful candidate for election in 1888 to the State house of representatives.
He served as delegate to all Republican State conventions in 1884–1927.
He served as delegate to the Republican National Convention in 1892.
He was one of the board of regents of the State normal school, Cape Girardeau, Missouri from 1893 to 1895.

Raney was elected as a Republican to the Fifty-fourth Congress (March 4, 1895 – March 3, 1897).
He was an unsuccessful candidate for reelection in 1896 to the Fifty-fifth Congress.
He resumed the practice of law in Piedmont, Missouri.
He was an unsuccessful candidate for circuit judge of the twenty-first judicial district in 1898.
He served as again prosecuting attorney of Wayne County in 1921 and 1922.
He died near Patterson, Missouri, January 23, 1928.
He was interred in the Masonic Cemetery, Piedmont, Missouri.

References

External links 
 

1849 births
1928 deaths
Republican Party members of the United States House of Representatives from Missouri
People from Wayne County, Missouri